1920 Zagreb local elections may refer to:

 March 1920 Zagreb local elections, won by Svetozar Delić against the incumbent Stjepan Srkulj
 June 1920 Zagreb local elections, won by Vjekoslav Heinzel